Ángel Manuel Robles Guerrero (born 18 November 2001) is a Mexican professional footballer who plays as a forward for Liga MX club Puebla.

International career
At the 2022 Maurice Revello Tournament Robles played in two games out of five, where the Mexico U-21 team finished in third.

Career statistics

Club

References

External links
 
 
 

Living people
2001 births
Mexican footballers
Mexico youth international footballers
Association football forwards
Atlético Morelia players
Club Puebla players
Liga MX players
Footballers from Jalisco
People from Puerto Vallarta